The Delicious One (otherwise known as TDO for short) or the World's Most Wanted Wiener, which has been the slogan, is the mascot of Wienerschnitzel. The Delicious One is an anthropomorphic chili dog. Almost everybody wants to eat the Delicious One due to him being a hot dog and the Delicious One's famous trademark is when he runs off screaming.

History
Wienerschnitzel created antenna toppers with the Delicious One on them holding a small, yellow box with a scared expression. There are also alternate versions of this antenna (one with the Delicious One wearing an Uncle Sam hat). In 2011, Wienerschnitzel released antenna toppers known as the Golden Wienie.

Television advertisements
In the commercials featuring the Delicious One, the Wienerschnitzel slogan "The World's Most Wanted Wiener" (which is also one of the alternative names for the Delicious One) is used. This is an outdated slogan, and the only time it is used now is in those commercials. Here are the commercials with the Delicious One:

 "Tea party": TDO runs into a little girl's bedroom and hides in her closet. She then wakes up, and, upon discovering him, decides to have a tea party with him. Her parents then enter and when she asks them if they can keep TDO, the father replies, "Oh, yeah. We can keep him." However, upon realizing that the father wants to eat him, TDO gasps wide-eyed, drops his cup of tea, and runs off screaming in terror.
 "Hawaii": TDO is on vacation at Hawaii, when a boat sails by and the driver tells his crew that they can now find their own food. This makes TDO spit his drink out, get off his hammock, and run off (but ends up crashing into a palm tree).
 "Saloon": TDO enters a saloon and says to the bartender, "It says outside that you serve hot dogs!" The bartender then puts a jar of mustard next to TDO and replies, "We do." Realizing that the man is going to try and eat him, TDO runs off screaming in terror.
 "Imposter":
 "Chili": TDO dances to promote Wienerschnitzel's new chili. Then he says, "Yum. Chili."
 "Exercise": TDO is exercising in his house, then goes outside and goes on a "jog" by having people run after him.
 "Blubber": TDO is sick of just having blubber with eskimos and suggests they have something spicy and hot. One of the eskimos then ask TDO (wide-eyed), "Like a chili dog?", to which TDO says yes, but after realizing his error, says no and that blubber's better. This makes the hot dog run away screaming.
 "Human Resources": TDO is at work complaining to the Human Resources manager about him constantly being harassed at work. While his co-workers make obscene gestures to him outside the office, after TDO asks the manager what she's gonna do about it, she replies, "Honestly... I'd say you're asking for it!" and closes the blinds on the two men, and TDO's scream can be heard. The chili dog then flees, screaming.
 "Predator": A spoof of To Catch a Predator. A man named Josh is expecting a date, but instead finds a man and a camera crew, and the man asks him embarrassing questions and finds ketchup and mustard jars in his backpack, and when asked if there was relish in the car, Josh nervously replies, "Yeah."
 "Gotcha" (2008): TDO is running from a young woman in a college dorm and crawls under the door into a student's room and hides under the bed's blankets and is almost caught by the girl, who ends up grabbing a sleeping man's crotch. This results in the girl, man, and TDO screaming in terror together. TDO then flees, screaming in terror.
 "Play Me": TDO dances to The Chubbies' song "Play Me" to promote Wienerschnitzel's new chili cheeseburger and chili cheese dog, which are both covered in cheese and smothered in chili.

References

Food advertising characters
Mascots introduced in 1999
Corporate mascots
Fictional food characters
Fast food advertising characters
Fictional anthropomorphic characters
Male characters in advertising
Advertising campaigns